The Mengkibol River is a small river in town of Kluang in the state of Johor, Malaysia. It is one of the tributaries of the Endau River.

See also
 Geography of Malaysia

Kluang District
Rivers of Johor